Andrea Corsini may refer to:
Andrew Corsini (1302–1373), Italian saint
Andrea Corsini (cardinal) (1735–1795), Italian cardinal